John Bailey Freeman (August 22, 1835 – November 22, 1890) was an Ontario farmer and political figure. He represented Norfolk North in the Legislative Assembly of Ontario from 1879 to 1890 as a Liberal member.

He was born in Windham Township, Norfolk County, Upper Canada in 1835, the son of Daniel Wesley Freeman and the grandson of the Reverend Daniel Freeman, one of the first settlers in the county. In 1861, he married Jane, the daughter of Thomas Scatcherd. Freeman served on the township council and was president of the county agricultural society. He served as government whip in the assembly.

Freeman Township in the Muskoka District was named after him.

External links 
The Canadian parliamentary companion, 1885 JA Gemmill

Pioneer Sketches of Long Point Settlement ..., EA Owen (1898)

1835 births
1890 deaths
Ontario Liberal Party MPPs
People from Norfolk County, Ontario